Ellingham may refer to:

Placenames
Ellingham, Hampshire, England
part of Ellingham, Harbridge and Ibsley civil parish
Ellingham Priory
Ellingham, Norfolk, England
Ellingham Hall, Norfolk
Ellingham railway station
Ellingham, Northumberland, England
Ellingham Hall, Northumberland

Surname
Harold Ellingham (1897–1975), British physical chemist
Dr Martin Ellingham, fictional protagonist of the TV series Doc Martin

See also
Ellingham diagram
Ellingham–Horton graph